Donald Leeson (25 August 1935 – 15 February 2009) was an English football goalkeeper who spent his entire professional career at Barnsley, where he played just over 100 first-team games.

Leeson, a native of Askern, then part of the West Riding of Yorkshire, signed a professional contract with Barnsley in 1954, and made his first-team debut for the Tykes during the 1956–57 season. He left Oakwell in 1961 to become a police officer in Grimsby. He continued to play football for several local non-league teams, and also represented the national police football team.

He retired from the police force in 1984, and died on 15 February 2009 following a long battle with lung cancer.

References
Obituary, Grimsby Telegraph (published 3 March 2009).

1935 births
2009 deaths
English footballers
Barnsley F.C. players
Deaths from lung cancer
Association football goalkeepers